Tlučná is a municipality and village in Plzeň-North District in the Plzeň Region of the Czech Republic. It has about 3,300 inhabitants.

Notable people
Pavel Soukup (born 1971), athlete; raised here

Twin towns – sister cities

Tlučná is twinned with:
 Floß, Germany

References

Villages in Plzeň-North District